Fernand Préfontaine (January 18, 1888 — January 10, 1949) was a Canadian architect, photographer, and art critic. Born in Montreal, Quebec, he completed his degree in architecture at the Polytechnique Montréal at the Université de Montréal in 1911.  In 1918 he co-founded the progressive arts magazine Le Nigog with pianist and composer Léo-Pol Morin and writer Robert de Roquebrune. He pursued further studies in Paris, arriving there in 1919, at the École des Beaux-Arts and the École du Louvre; earning degrees in art history and archaeology.

He worked as an architect in Montreal and died there in 1949.

References

1888 births
1949 deaths
École des Beaux-Arts alumni
École du Louvre alumni
Architects from Montreal
Artists from Montreal
Canadian art critics
Canadian architects
Université de Montréal alumni
19th-century Canadian photographers